In symplectic geometry, the symplectic frame bundle of a given symplectic manifold  is the canonical principal -subbundle  of the tangent frame bundle  consisting of linear frames which are symplectic with respect to .
 and 

The symplectic frame bundle , a subbundle of the tangent frame bundle , is an example of reductive G-structure on the manifold .

See also
 Metaplectic group
 Metaplectic structure
 Symplectic basis
 Symplectic structure
 Symplectic geometry
 Symplectic group
 Symplectic spinor bundle

Notes

Books
 
da Silva, A.C., Lectures on Symplectic Geometry, Springer (2001). .
 Maurice de Gosson: Symplectic Geometry and Quantum Mechanics (2006) Birkhäuser Verlag, Basel .

Symplectic geometry
Structures on manifolds
Algebraic topology